Ian James Lawson (born 4 November 1977) is an English former professional footballer who played 131 games in the Football League as a forward for Huddersfield Town, Blackpool, Bury and Stockport County.

His father Jimmy was also a professional footballer.

References

1977 births
Living people
Footballers from Huddersfield
English footballers
Association football forwards
Huddersfield Town A.F.C. players
Blackpool F.C. players
Bury F.C. players
Stockport County F.C. players
English Football League players